Ferric oxalate, also known as iron(III) oxalate, is a chemical compound composed of ferric ions and oxalate ligands; it may also be regarded as the ferric salt of oxalic acid.

Structure

Tetrahydrate

The crystal structure of the tetrahydrate  was determined in 2015. It has a triclinic unit cell containing two iron atoms. Each iron atom has octahedral coordination bonds to the oxygen atoms of three oxalate molecules and one water molecule. Two of those three oxalates, lying in approximately perpendicular planes, are tetradentate, and connect the iron atoms into zigzag chains. The third oxalate molecule is bidentate, and connects iron atoms of adjacent chains, creating an open-layered structure.  Half of the water molecules lie, unbound, between those chains. Mössbauer spectrum  of   indicates that iron is present in a unique environment with an isomer shift of 0.38 mm/s and a quadrupole splitting of 0.40 mm/s, suggesting a high spin  in octahedral coordination.

Uses

Dentistry
Like many oxalates, ferric oxalate has been investigated as a short-term treatment for dentin hypersensitivity. It is used in certain toothpaste formulations; however, its effectiveness has been questioned.

Photography
Ferric oxalate is used as the light-sensitive element in the Kallitype photographic printing process; and the platinotype process Platinum/Palladium Printing.

Batteries
Ferric oxalate tetrahydrate has been investigated as a possible cheap material for the positive electrode of lithium-iron batteries. It can intercalate lithium ions at an average potential of 3.35 V, and has shown a sustainable capacity of 98 mAh/g.

Organic synthesis 
Ferric oxalate hexahydrate is used with sodium borohydride for radical Markovnikov hydrofunctionalization reactions of alkenes.

See also
A number of other iron oxalates are known:-
Iron(II) oxalate
Potassium ferrioxalate
Sodium ferrioxalate

References 

Oxalates
Iron(III) compounds